The Saint Francis Cougars football program represents the University of Saint Francis in college football. The team competes in the Mideast League (MEL) of the Mid-States Football Association (MSFA), which is affiliated with the National Association of Intercollegiate Athletics (NAIA). Kevin Donley has served as head coach since the inception of the program in 1998. Saint Francis plays its home game at Bishop John M. D'Arcy Stadium in Fort Wayne, Indiana.

Under Donley, the Saint Francis won consecutive NAIA Football National Championship in 2016 and 2017. The Cougars have won the MSFA's Mideast League 13 times and have made 19 appearances in the NAIA playoffs.

Season-by-season record

Program statistics

References

External links
 

 
American football teams established in 1998
1998 establishments in Indiana